Bavon Makr (also Romanized as Bāvon Makr; also known as Pāvan Makr) is a village in Vizhenan Rural District, in the Central District of Gilan-e Gharb County, Kermanshah Province, Iran. At the 2006 census, its population was 132, in 26 families.

References 

Populated places in Gilan-e Gharb County